Bodianus rubrisos, the red-sashed hogfish or morsecode pigfish, is a species of wrasse native to tropical and warm temperate waters of the Indo-West Pacific, particularly Japan, Taiwan and Indonesia. It has been recorded off Australia at Scott Reef in Western Australia and in the Arafura Sea off the Northern Territory.

Etymology
The specific name is a compound of the Latin rubri meaning "red" and the letters s, o and s, a reference to the dot and dash morse code like colour pattern which is distinctive for this species.

References

Further reading
RANDALL, JOHN E., and BENJAMIN C. VICTOR. "Bodianus atrolumbus (Valenciennes 1839), a valid species of labrid fish from the southwest Indian Ocean."

External links

rubrisos
Taxa named by Martin F. Gomon 
Fish described in 2006